Allenna Leonard is an American cyberneticist, consultant and director of Team Syntegrity International, specializing in the application of Stafford Beer's Viable System Model and Syntegration.  She was president of the International Society for the Systems Sciences in 2009–2010, and led the organization of its 54th annual meeting in Waterloo, Canada.

Biography 
She received a B.A. Classic liberal arts curriculum from the St. John's College in Annapolis, Maryland, a M.A. in Higher Education Administration from the George Washington University in Washington D.C. and a Ph.D. from the University of Maryland, College Park, in administration with a concentration in cybernetics.

Leonard is consultant under auspices of The Complementary Set, especially applications of the Viable System Model, a part-time University Teacher, Licensee T.S.I. and a representative of Cwarel Isaf Institute. Currently she is Director of Team Syntegrity Inc. of Toronto, Ontario, Canada. She was president of the American Society for Cybernetics from 2002 to 2004, and was elected president for 2009–2010 of the International Society for the Systems Sciences.
 
Allenna Leonard was Stafford Beer’s partner in life and in work from 1981 until his death in 2002. She states on her web page that she is committed to continuing to use and publicize his work, and that her special interest is using Syntegration as a forum for democratic dialogue, especially on issues of public importance.

See also 
 Variety (cybernetics)
 Viable System Model

Publications 
Allenna Leonard has published several works on cybernetics and the work of Stafford Beer. A selection:
 
 
 

Articles and papers, a selection:

References

External links 
 
 Biography at University of Hull.

American systems scientists
Living people
University of Maryland, College Park alumni
Year of birth missing (living people)
St. John's College (Annapolis/Santa Fe) alumni
George Washington University Graduate School of Education and Human Development alumni
Women systems scientists
Women cyberneticists
Presidents of the International Society for the Systems Sciences